Milford Independent School District is a public school district based in Milford, Texas (USA).

In 2009, the school district was rated "academically acceptable" by the Texas Education Agency.

Schools
Milford ISD is consolidated into one large building, located on U.S. Highway 77 on the southern end of Milford. It houses all of the district's approximately 240 students, grades K-12, and includes the district's only high school, Milford High School.

Academics
Milford ISD offers band, FFA, National Honors Society and Gifted/Talented sources, and journalism. There are also fine arts studies available such as photography, art and theatre.

Athletics
Milford school athletics offers girls volleyball, boys and girls basketball, track and field, and six-man football.

See also

List of school districts in Texas 
List of high schools in Texas

References

External links

School districts in Ellis County, Texas
School districts in Hill County, Texas